TV Puerto is a Venezuelan community television channel.  It was created in December 2003 and can be seen in the community of Puerto La Cruz in the Juan Antonio Sotillo Municipality of the Anzoategui State of Venezuela on UHF channel 21.  Victor Acuña is the legal representative of the foundation that owns this channel.

TV Puerto does not have a website.

See also
List of Venezuelan television channels

Television networks in Venezuela
Television stations in Venezuela
Television channels and stations established in 2003